Sunrise Dam Airport  is located at the Sunrise Dam Gold Mine, Western Australia.

The airport is serviced by Skippers Aviation charter flights from Perth Airport for the Sunrise Dam Gold Mine.

See also
 List of airports in Western Australia
 Aviation transport in Australia

References

External links
 
 Airservices Aerodromes & Procedure Charts

Airports in Western Australia
Goldfields-Esperance